Deir Mawas or Deir Muas is a city in Egypt. It is located in the Minya Governorate, on the west bank of the Nile.Statistics for the year 2023 and the population density is 45,261, of which 23,361 are men and 22,900 are women.

History

The name of the city likely comes from a now vanished Coptic monastery of Archangel Michael.

On 18 March 1919, the people of Deir Mawas joined the revolution against Great Britain, which swept across Egypt. They cut the railway-roads and killed a number of British officers, and the British retaliated by executing a number of the city's civilians. The day of 18 March has become the official holiday of Al Minya Governorate in commemoration of those executed by the British.

See also

 List of cities and towns in Egypt

References

Populated places in Minya Governorate